Valentina Stratan-Golban is a Moldovan politician.

She served as member of the Parliament of Moldova from 2005 to 2009.

External links 
 Parlamentul Republicii Moldova
  List of candidates to the position of deputy in the Parliament of the Republic of Moldova for parliamentary elections of 6 March, 2005 of the Electoral Bloc “Moldova Democrata”
 List of deputies elected in the March 6 parliamentary elections
 Lista deputaţilor aleşi la 6 martie 2005 în Parlamentul Republicii Moldova

References

1962 births
Living people
Moldovan MPs 2005–2009
Electoral Bloc Democratic Moldova MPs
Moldovan female MPs
21st-century Moldovan women politicians